Robert Edward Graves (7 November 1942 – 9 March 2021) was an English footballer who made 79 appearances in the Football League playing as a goalkeeper for Lincoln City. He previously played non-league football for Kirton. He died on 9 March 2021.

References

1942 births
2021 deaths
Footballers from Marylebone
English footballers
Association football goalkeepers
Lincoln City F.C. players
English Football League players